Punta Mulas Light, also known as Faro de Vieques, is a historic lighthouse located in the north shore of  Vieques, an island-municipality of Puerto Rico. It was first lit in 1896 and automated in 1949. Punta Mulas Light was the second lighthouse built on Vieques after the Puerto Ferro Light. The light was established to guide through the dangerous passage formed by a chain of reefs. It was of key importance for navigation in the San Juan Passage.

In 1992, the lighthouse was restored in celebration of the 500th anniversary of Christopher Columbus's first voyage to America. The structure houses a museum featuring the maritime history of Vieques and the Americas as well as other historical exhibits. It's listed in the U.S. National Register of Historic Places.

See also
 Puerto Ferro Light: also built in 1896 on Vieques
 List of lighthouses in Puerto Rico

References

External links

Photos of Punta Mulas Lighthouse

Historic American Engineering Record in Puerto Rico
Lighthouses on the National Register of Historic Places in Puerto Rico
Vieques, Puerto Rico
Neoclassical architecture in Puerto Rico
Lighthouses completed in 1896
1896 establishments in the Spanish Empire
1890s establishments in Puerto Rico
History museums in Puerto Rico